Arrowhead Pharmaceuticals is a publicly traded biopharmaceutical company based in Pasadena, California. Arrowhead’s products in development act through RNA interference (RNAi) mechanisms of action. The company focuses on treatments for hepatitis B, liver disease associated with alpha 1-antitrypsin deficiency and cardiovascular disease. The company has eight products in its pipeline, in various stages of development.

In 2015, the company substantially expanded its intellectual property holdings through complete acquisition of the full RNAi research and development portfolio, and assets from Novartis.

In April 2016, it was announced that the former company name, Arrowhead Research Corporation, will be changed to Arrowhead Pharmaceuticals, Inc.

In September 2016, Arrowhead entered into two collaboration and licensing agreements with Amgen. Under the deals, Amgen received a worldwide exclusive license to Arrowhead’s ARO-LPA RNAi program and an option to a worldwide exclusive license for ARO-AMG1, both for cardiovascular disease.

On Oct. 31, 2018, Arrowhead Pharmaceuticals Inc. closed on a $3.7 billion license and collaboration agreement with Janssen to develop and commercialize ARO-HBV. As part of the deal, Arrowhead entered into a research collaboration and option agreement with Janssen to potentially collaborate for up to three more RNA interference (RNAi) therapeutics against new targets to be selected by Janssen.

References 

Pharmaceutical companies of the United States